The Man from Oklahoma  is a 1945 American western film directed by Frank McDonald and starring Roy Rogers, Dale Evans and George 'Gabby' Hayes. It was produced and distributed by Republic Pictures.

Plot
Jim Gardner, hoping to acquire the Pine Valley section around Cherokee City, Oklahoma, for the oil rights, instigates and renews an old-time feud between the Lanes and the Whittakers as each family owns half the valley. Roy Rogers and the Sons of the Pioneers take up the fight against Gardner and manage to settle the Lane-Whittaker feud.

Cast
 Roy Rogers as Roy
 Dale Evans as Peggy Lane
 George "Gabby" Hayes as Gabby Whitaker
 Roger Pryor as Jim Gardner
 Trigger as Trigger
 Arthur Loft as J. J. Cardigan
 Maude Eburne as Grandma Lane
 Sam Flint as 	Mayor Witherspoon
 Si Jenks as Jeff Whittaker
 June Gittelson as Little Bird on the Wing 
 Elaine Lange as Secretary Vera
 Charles Soldani as Chief Red Feather
 Edmund Cobb as 	Henchman Ferguson
 George Sherwood as Henchman Slade
 Eddie Kane as 	Bill - Club Manager
 Sons of the Pioneers as 	Musicians

References

Bibliography
 Hurst, Richard M. Republic Studios: Beyond Poverty Row and the Majors. Scarecrow Press, 2007.
 Pitts, Michael R. Western Movies: A Guide to 5,105 Feature Films. McFarland, 2012.

External links
 

1945 films
Republic Pictures films
1945 Western (genre) films
American Western (genre) films
American black-and-white films
Films directed by Frank McDonald
1940s English-language films
1940s American films
Films set in Oklahoma